Boletus subalpinus is a species of fungus in the family Boletaceae. The species was first described scientifically in 1969  by American mycologists Harry Delbert Thiers and James M. Trappe. It is found in California and Oregon. It was originally named as a species of Gastroboletus but was found to be in Boletus sensu stricto in a 2013 molecular phylogenetics study.

See also
List of Boletus species
List of North American boletes

References

External links

subalpinus
Fungi described in 1969
Fungi of North America
Taxa named by Harry Delbert Thiers